Bob, Bobby, Robbie or Robert Allen may refer to:

Composers
Robert William Otto Allen (1852–1888), Danish pianist, composer and conductor
Robert Allen (song composer) (1927–2000), American pianist and arranger

Performers
Robert Allen (actor) (1906–1998), American stage, film and TV performer
Robbie Allen (musician), American bassist and guitarist

Politicians
Robert Allen (Tennessee politician) (1778–1844), American congressperson
Robert Allen (Virginia politician) (1794–1859), American congressperson
Robert Allen (Irish politician), MP for Carysfort in County Wicklow
Robert E. Lee Allen (1865–1951), American congressperson from West Virginia
Robert Allen (Ontario politician) (1888–1969), Canadian member of Legislative Assembly of Ontario
Robert G. Allen (1902–1963), American congressperson from Pennsylvania
Robert E. Allen (politician) (1924–2014), American legislator in Colorado
Bob Allen (Pennsylvania politician) (born 1945), American state legislator
Bob Allen (Florida politician) (born 1958), American state legislator

Sportsmen

Baseball
Bob Allen (shortstop) (1867–1943), American baseball player and manager
Al Elliott  (Robert Allen, 1894–1975), American football halfback and baseball center fielder
Bob Allen (1930s pitcher) (1914–2005), American right-hander in National League, 1937
Bob Allen (1960s pitcher) (born 1937), American League left-hander, 1961–67
Robbie Allen (baseball) (born 1959), American baseball player and coach

Basketball
Bob Allen (basketball) (born 1946), American power forward
Bobby Allen (basketball) (born 1969), Canadian point and shooting guard

Football
Bob Allen (Australian footballer) (1908–1992), player with Fitzroy in VFL
Bob Allen (footballer, born 1916) (1916–1992), English winger
Robert Allen (footballer) (1886–1981), English forward and British Army major-general

Other sports
Bobby Allen (racing driver) (born 1943), American racer of winged sprint cars
Robert Allen (boxer) (born 1969), American middleweight
Bobby Allen (ice hockey) (born 1978), American defenseman in NHL

Writers
Bob Allen (surgeon) (1772–1805), English journalist and surgeon
Robert S. Allen (1900–1981), American investigative journalist
Robert Porter Allen (1905–1963), American ornithologist and environmentalist
Robert Thomas Allen (1911–1990), Canadian humorist
Robert Livingston Allen (1916–1982), American educator and linguist
Robert L. Allen (born 1942), African-American activist and academic
Robert Allen (lexicographer) (born 1944), British lexicographer and author
Bob Allen (economic historian) (born 1947), American professor of economic history at Oxford University
Robert Allen (poet), English author of 1994's Canny Bit Verse in Northumbrian dialect

Others
Robert Allen (murderer) (born 1996), American man convicted for the murder of XXXTentacion
Robert Allen (general) (1811–1886), American Civil War Union general
Robert Calder Allen (1812–1903), English naval captain
Robert Allen (Baptist minister) (1847–1927), Welsh clergyman in Glamorganshire
Robert E. Allen (telecommunications executive) (1935–2016), American CEO and chairman of AT&T

See also
Bobbie Allen (disambiguation)
Robert Allan (disambiguation)
Bert Allen (disambiguation)